Hòa Xuân Stadium is a football-specific stadium in Da Nang, Vietnam. It is located in Cam Le District, just outside of the main city centre. The stadium has been the home of football team SHB Đà Nẵng F.C. since 2016. The stadium has a capacity of 20,500.

Construction
Construction began in 2013 and was completed in 2016 at an estimated cost of 281 billion Vietnamese đồng.
The stadium replaced the previous stadium of SHB Đà Nẵng F.C., Chi Lăng Stadium from the beginning of the 2016/17 V.League 1 season.

References

Football venues in Vietnam
Buildings and structures in Da Nang
Multi-purpose stadiums in Vietnam
SHB Da Nang FC
Sports venues completed in 2016
2016 establishments in Vietnam